Martín Espada (born 1957) is a Puerto Rican-American poet, and a professor at the University of Massachusetts Amherst, where he teaches poetry. Puerto Rico has frequently been featured as a theme in his poems.

Life and career 
Espada was born in Brooklyn, New York. He was introduced to political activism at an early age by his father, Frank Espada, a leader in the Puerto Rican community and the civil rights movement. Espada received a B.A. in history from the University of Wisconsin–Madison and a J.D. from Northeastern University (Boston, Massachusetts). For many years, he worked as a tenant lawyer and a supervisor of a legal services program. In 1982, Espada published his first book of political poems, The Immigrant Iceboy's Bolero, featuring photography by his father. This was followed by Trumpets from the Islands of their Eviction (1987) and Rebellion is the Circle of a Lover's Hands. In 2001, he was named the first Poet Laureate of Northampton, Massachusetts.In 2018, Espada received the Ruth Lilly Poetry Prize, a lifetime achievement award given by the Poetry Foundation to a living U.S. poet that carries a $100,000 prize. Espada was the first Latino recipient of the honor.

About his first and subsequent visits to meet family in Puerto Rico, Espada said it was "absolutely transformative", an "absolute revelation", "a process of self-discovery", and that "going there affirms you have a history". His poem "Coca Cola and Coco Frio" is about that.

In 2009, Espada performed in The People Speak, a documentary feature film that uses dramatic and musical performances of the letters, diaries, and speeches of everyday Americans, based on historian Howard Zinn's A People's History of the United States.

In 2021, Espada won the National Book Award for Poetry for his poem "Floaters" about two migrants, Oscar and his daughter Valeria, who drowned crossing the Rio Grande at the U.S. Border.

Espada is a professor at the University of Massachusetts Amherst, and lives in Shelburne Falls, Massachusetts.

Awards and honours 
 Massachusetts Artists Foundation Fellowship in Poetry, 1984
 National Endowment for the Arts Creative Writing Fellowship, 1986
 PEN/Revson Foundation Fellowship in Poetry, 1989
 Paterson Poetry Prize, 1991
 National Endowment for the Arts Creative Writing Fellowship, 1992
 Massachusetts Cultural Council Artist Grant, 1996
 National Book Critics Circle Award Finalist, 1997
 Before Columbus Foundation American Book Award, 1997
 Gustavus Myers Center Outstanding Book Award, 1998
 Pushcart Prize, 1999
 Independent Publisher Book Award, 1999
 Poet Laureate of Northampton, Massachusetts, 2001
 Antonia Pantoja Award, 2003
 American Library Association Notable Book, 2004
 Robert Creeley Award, 2004
 Charity Randall Citation, 2005
 John Simon Guggenheim Memorial Foundation Fellowship, 2006
 Pulitzer Prize Finalist, 2007
 San Francisco Chronicle Best Books, 2007
 Library Journal Best Poetry Books, 2007
 Paterson Award for Sustained Literary Achievement, 2007
 Premio Fronterizo, 2007
 National Hispanic Cultural Center Literary Award, 2008
 USA Simon Fellowship, 2010
 Massachusetts Book Award, 2012
 Milt Kessler Poetry Book Award, 2012
 International Latino Book Award, 2012
 Walt Whitman Birthplace Poet in Residence, 2012
 Busboys and Poets Award, 2014
 Academy of American Poets Fellowship, 2018
 Ruth Lilly Poetry Prize, 2018
 National Book Award for Poetry, 2021

Works

Books of poetry 
The Immigrant Iceboy's Bolero, Waterfront Press, 1982, 
Trumpets from the Islands of Their Eviction, Bilingual Press, 1987, 
Rebellion is the Circle of a Lover's Hands, Curbstone Press, 1990, 
City of Coughing and Dead Radiators, W.W. Norton, 1993, 
Imagine the Angels of Bread, Norton, 1996, 
A Mayan Astronomer in Hell's Kitchen, Norton, 2000, 
Alabanza: New and Selected Poems 1982-2002 (W.W. Norton, 2003 US, 2004 UK)

La República de la Poesía (Mago Editores, Chile, 2007)
Crucifixion in the Plaza de Armas, Smokestack Books, 2008, 
La Tumba de Buenaventura Roig (Terranova Editores, Puerto Rico, 2008)
Soldados en el Jardín (El Gaviero Ediciones, Spain, 2009)
 U.S.;, 2012, UK

Floaters : Poems, W.W.Norton, 2021,

Books of essays 

Auf der Suche nach La Revolución (Agentur Machtwort, Germany, 2004)

As editor 
Poetry Like Bread: Poets of the Political Imagination (Curbstone, 1994)
 
His Hands Were Gentle: Selected Lyrics of Víctor Jara (Smokestack, UK, 2012)
What Saves Us: Poems of Empathy and Outrage in the Age of Trump (Northwestern University Press, Curbstone, 2019)

In anthology 
Ghost Fishing: An Eco-Justice Poetry Anthology, University of Georgia Press, 2018, 
Seeds of Fire: Contemporary Poetry from the Other U. S. A. Smokestack Books.

See also 
 List of Puerto Rican writers
 List of Puerto Ricans
 Puerto Rican literature
 Latino poetry
 The Saint Vincent de Paul Food Pantry Stomp

References

External links 

 
 
 Martín Espada Official site
 Martín Espada Papers at the Amherst College Archives and Special Collections
 Martín Espada at Modern American Poetry
 Martín Espada Poems and Profile at Poets.org

1957 births
Living people
20th-century American poets
21st-century American poets
American book editors
Hispanic and Latino American poets
Northeastern University School of Law alumni
Puerto Rican poets
Puerto Rican male writers
Poets from New York (state)
Poets from Massachusetts
University of Wisconsin–Madison College of Letters and Science alumni
Writers from Brooklyn
University of Massachusetts Amherst faculty
American Book Award winners
20th-century American male writers
21st-century American male writers
National Book Award winners